EG&G, formally known as Edgerton, Germeshausen, and Grier, Inc., was a United States national defense contractor and provider of management and technical services. The company was involved in contracting services to the United States government during World War II and conducted weapons research and development during the Cold war era (from 1948 and onward). It had close involvement with some of the government's most sensitive technologies.

History

Early history 
In 1931, Massachusetts Institute of Technology (MIT) professor Harold Edgerton, a pioneer of high-speed photography, partnered with his graduate student Kenneth Germeshausen to found a small technical consulting firm. The two were joined by fellow MIT graduate student Herbert E. Grier in 1934. Bernard "Barney" O'Keefe became the fourth member of their fledgling technology group.

The group's high-speed photography was used to image implosion tests during the Manhattan Project. The same skills in precisely timed high-power electrical pulses also formed a key enabling technology for nuclear weapon triggers. After the war, the group continued their association with the burgeoning military nuclear effort and formally incorporated Edgerton, Germeshausen, and Grier, Inc. in 1947.

1950s and 1960s 
During the 1950s and 1960s, EG&G was involved in nuclear tests as a major contractor for the Atomic Energy Commission. EG&G made extensive use of the Nevada Test Site (NTS) for weapons development and high-technology military testing at Nellis AFB. EG&G has shared operations responsibility for the NTS with Livermore Labs, Raytheon Services Nevada, Reynolds Electrical and Engineering (REECO) and others. Subsequently, EG&G expanded its range of services, providing facilities management, technical services, security, and pilot training for the U.S. military and other government departments. EG&G builds a variety of sensing, detection and imaging products including night vision equipment, sensors for detection of nuclear material and chemical and biological weapons agents, and a variety of acoustic sensors. The company also supplies microwave and electronic components to the government, security systems, and systems for electronic warfare and mine countermeasures.

1970s and 1980s 
During the 1970s and 1980s, the company, then led by O'Keefe, diversified by acquisition into the fields of paper making, instrumentation for scientific, marine, environmental and geophysical users, automotive testing, fans and blowers, frequency control devices and other components including BBD and CCD technology via their Reticon division. In the late 1980s and early 1990s most of these divisions were sold, and on 28 May 1999, the non-government side of EG&G Inc.; formerly ; purchased the Analytical Instruments Division of PerkinElmer for million (equivalent to $million in ), also assuming the PerkinElmer name. At the time EG&G was based in Wellesley, Massachusetts, and made products for diverse industries including automotive, medical, aerospace and photography.

1999–present 
From 1999 until 2001, EG&G was wholly owned by The Carlyle Group.

In August 2002, the defense-and-services sector of the company was acquired by defense technical-services giant URS Corporation. URS' EG&G division is headquartered in Gaithersburg, Maryland, and employs over 11,000 people. During its heyday in the 1980s, EG&G had about 35,000 employees.

In December 2009, URS announced its decision to discontinue the use of "EG&G" as a division name. The headquarters issued a press release stating that by January 1, 2010 it would discontinue using secondary corporate brands, including the EG&G name and logo. In the same press release, URS stated that it would also retire two other acquired brands, Washington Group and Lear Siegler. URS Chief Executive Officer Martin Koffel explained the change in an e-mail transmitted to employees: "In today's marketplace, it is essential we present a consistent, unified brand to our customers and achieve the competitive advantages enjoyed by our peers in the industry. ... This change will allow us to present a single brand that is easily understood by our clients". Koffel indicated that the move to a single corporate brand would affect neither the internal organization nor the existing reporting structure. However, EG&G Division would become URS Federal Services.

In 2014, URS was acquired by AECOM. In January 2020, AECOM sold its Management Services division, which provides services and support to governmental clients, to the private equity firm American Securities and Lindsay Goldberg for billion (equivalent to $billion in ); the new firm was named Amentum.

Janet Airlines 
EG&G's "Special Projects" division was the notable operator of the Janet Terminal at McCarran International Airport [Now Harry Reid] Las Vegas, Nevada, a service used to transport employees to remote government locations in Nevada and California. EG&G also had a joint venture with Raytheon Technical Services, creating JT3 LLC in 2000, which operates the Joint Range Technical Services contract.

Lear Siegler Services, Inc. 
EG&G Technical Services, Inc. and Lear Siegler Services, Inc. consolidated, becoming one of the nation's leading U.S. federal government contractors providing operations and maintenance, systems engineering and technical assistance, and program management, primarily to the Departments of Defense and Homeland Security. The companies are separate legal entities, but share a common management. In December 2009, URS announced its decision to discontinue the Lear Siegler name for this division.

EG&G's clients 

 Atomic Energy Commission
 Area 51
 Central Intelligence Agency
 Defense Logistics Agency
 Department of Defense
 Department of Energy
 Department of Homeland Security

 Department of Transportation
 Department of the Treasury
 NASA
 National Oceanic and Atmospheric Administration
 U.S. Coast Guard
 U.S. Space Command

See also 
 Krytron
 Tactical Control System

References

Further reading

Technology companies established in 1947
Companies based in Gaithersburg, Maryland
Instrument-making corporations
1947 establishments in Maryland
Defense companies of the United States